This is a list of psychiatric medications used by psychiatrists and other physicians to treat mental illness or distress. 

The list is ordered alphabetically according to the condition or conditions, then by the generic name of each medication. The list is not exhaustive and not all drugs are used regularly in all countries. Some medications treat multiple conditions and appear multiple times.

Drug Dependence Therapy

Used in the treatment of alcoholism and opioid dependence

Used for smoking cessation

Attention Deficit Hyperactivity Disorder

Stimulants

Non-Stimulant Medications

Anxiety Disorders

Benzodiazepines

Non-Benzodiazepine Anxiolytics

Antidepressants

Non-Pharmaceutical

Autism

Atypical antipsychotics

Bipolar Disorder

Mood Stabilizers

Atypical Antipsychotics

Depressive Disorders

Non-Pharmaceutical

Insomnia

Benzodiazepines

Z-Drugs

Melatonergic Agents

Barbiturates

Sedating Antidepressants

Antihistamines

Others

Non-Pharmaceutical

Psychotic Disorders

Typical antipsychotics

Low potency

Medium potency

High potency

Atypical Antipsychotics

Adjuncts

See also 
 List of psychiatric medications

Notes

References

External links 
  Children and Medication - a multimodal presentation
 Psychiatric Treatments and Medications

 
Medications by condition treated, list of
Psychopharmacology